Oumar Abakar (born 1 September 1979) is a Chadian professional football player. He made nine appearances for the Chad national football team.

See also
 List of Chad international footballers

References

External links
 

1979 births
Living people
Chadian footballers
Chad international footballers
People from N'Djamena
Association football defenders